The following are international rankings of .

Demographics  

Population ranked 134 out 233 nations

Economy  

Nominal GDP ranked 80 out of 216 economies
GDP per capita – 60th highest, at I$11,969
Income Equality, 0.449 (Gini Index)
Unemployment rate – 112th, at 8.70%

Education 

Literacy Rate – 51st, at 97.7%

Energy  

Total electricity consumption ranked 88th highest consumption

Environment 

Carbon dioxide emissions per capita ranked 125th highest emissions

Geography  

Area ranked 89 out of 195 countries with 175,015 sq km

Globalization

Government

Health

Fertility rate- 140th most fertile, at 1.85 per woman
Birth rate – 157th most births, at 13.91 per 1000 people
Infant mortality – 128th most deaths, at 1 per 1000 live births
Death rate – 84th highest death rate, at 9.16 per 1000 people
Life Expectancy – 47th highest, at 76.4 years
Suicide Rate – 24th highest suicide rate, at 15.1 for males and 6.4 for females per 100,000 people
HIV/AIDS rate – 108th most cases, at 0.30%

Military  

Global Peace Index 2009, ranked 25
Military expenditures as a percentage of GDP ranked 104

Politics

Religion

Society 

Smoking in Uruguay: first country in Latin America to establish an indoor smoking ban
Human Development Index – 46th high, at 0.852

Technology

Tourism

Transport

Latin America comparative index

Political and economic rankings
GDP per capita – 60th highest, at I$11,969
Human Development Index – 46th highest, at 0.852
Income Equality, 0.449 (Gini Index)
Literacy Rate – 51st, at 97.7%
Unemployment rate – 112th, at 8.70%

Health rankings
Fertility rate- 140th most fertile, at 1.85 per woman
Birth rate – 157th most births, at 13.91 per 1000 people
Infant mortality – 128th most deaths, at 1 per 1000 live births
Death rate – 84th highest death rate, at 9.16 per 1000 people
Life Expectancy – 47th highest, at 76.4 years
Suicide Rate – 24th highest suicide rate, at 15.1 for males and 6.4 for females per 100,000 people
HIV/AIDS rate – 108th most cases, at 0.30%

Other rankings
CO2 emissions – 125th highest emissions, at 1.65 tonnes per capita
Electricity Consumption – 88th highest consumption of electricity, at 7,762,000,000 kWh
Broadband Internet access – no data
Global Peace Index – 25th highest peace rate in 2009

Comparative ranking by index

See also

Lists of countries
Lists by country
List of international rankings

References 

Uruguay